William McGarvie (1810 – 1 April 1841) was a Scottish-born bookseller and newspaper owner, active in New South Wales.

McGarvie was born in Glasgow and worked on the Glasgow Herald; he followed his brother John McGarvie to New South Wales in 1828 aboard the Comet. He then ran the 'Australian Stationery Warehouse'.

With two employees from the Sydney Gazette Frederick Stokes and Alfred Ward Stephens, McGarvie imported a printing press in 1831 and commenced publication of the Sydney Herald. Its first edition was on 18 April 1831. Soon afterwards, McGarvie sold his share to his two other partners.

After a brief trip back to Scotland, McGarvie resumed bookselling at the Australian Warehouse. After contracting a severe cold, he died in Sydney aged 31 years and was survived by his wife, Isabella, and a three-week-old son. Isabella later remarried Dr Frederick Mackellar whose only son was Charles Mackellar, who in turn had a daughter, the poet Dorothea Mackellar.

References

1820 births
1841 deaths
Australian newspaper editors
Australian newspaper founders
Businesspeople from Glasgow
Scottish emigrants to Australia
19th-century British journalists
British male journalists
19th-century British male writers
Australian booksellers
19th-century Australian newspaper publishers (people)